The Ministry of Irrigation and Water Resources is a ministry of the Government of South Sudan. The incumbent minister is Manawa Peter Gatkuoth , while Ali Keti Ochie serves as deputy minister.

List of Ministers of Irrigation and Water Resources

References

Irrigation and Water Resources
South Sudan, Irrigation and Water Resources
South Sudan
South Sudan
2011 establishments in South Sudan